Tulva is a river in Perm Krai, Russia.

Tulva may also refer to:
 Tulva, a Finnish feminist magazine